Louisiana is a South Central U.S. state, with a 2020 U.S. census resident population of 4,657,757, and apportioned population of 4,661,468. Much of the state's population is concentrated in southern Louisiana in the Greater New Orleans, Florida Parishes, and Acadiana regions, with the remainder in North and Central Louisiana's major metropolitan areas (Shreveport-Bossier City; Monroe-West Monroe; and Alexandria). The center of population of Louisiana is located in Pointe Coupee Parish, in the city of New Roads.

Race and ethnicity

Since end of the 20th century, Louisiana's population has experienced diversification, and its non-Hispanic or Latin American white population has been declining. As of 2020, the Black or African American population have made up the largest non-white share of youths. Hispanic and Latino Americans have also increased as the second-largest racial and ethnic composition in the state, making up nearly 10% of Louisiana's population at the 2020 census. The Asian American and multiracial communities have also experienced rapid growth, with many of Louisiana's multiracial population identifying as Cajun or Louisiana Creole.

According to the 2020 U.S. census, 57.1% of the total population were White Americans; 31.4% were Black or African American, 0.7% American Indian and Alaska Native, 1.9% Asian, <0.0% Native Hawaiian or other Pacific Islander, 3.1% some other race, and 5.9% two or more races. The Hispanic and Latino American population of any race were 6.9% of the total population.

At the 2019 American Community Survey, the largest ancestry groups of Louisiana were African American (31.4%), French (9.6%), German (6.2%), English (4.6%), Italian (4.2%), and Scottish (0.9%). African American and French heritage have been dominant since colonial Louisiana. As of 2011, 49.0% of Louisiana's population younger than age1 were minorities.

White and European Americans 
In Louisiana, White and European Americans of Southern U.S. background predominate the population and culture in northern and central Louisiana. These people are predominantly of English, Huguenot French, Welsh, and Irish/Scots Irish backgrounds, and share a common, mostly Protestant culture with Americans of neighboring states. The majority of the White American population concentrated upstate are religiously affiliated with the Southern Baptist Convention.

Before the Louisiana Purchase, some German families had settled in a rural area along the lower Mississippi valley, then known as the German Coast. They assimilated into the Cajun and Creole communities.

In 1840, New Orleans was the third largest and most wealthy city in the U.S. and the largest city in the South. Its bustling port and trade economy attracted numerous Irish, Italian, Spanish, Portuguese and German immigrants, of which the first four groups were mostly Catholic with some Germans also being Catholic, thus adding to the Roman Catholic culture in southern Louisiana. New Orleans is also home to sizable Dutch, Greek and Polish communities, and Jewish populations of various nationalities. More than 10,000 Maltese were reported to come to Louisiana in the early 20th century. Croatians are credited with developing the state's commercial oyster industry.

Cajuns and Creoles 

Cajuns and Creoles of French ancestry are dominant in much of the southern part of the state of Louisiana, alongside non-Cajun or non-Creole Americans of White or Black/African American heritage. Louisiana Cajuns are the descendants of French-speaking Acadians from colonial French Acadia, which is now the present-day Canadian provinces of New Brunswick, Nova Scotia and Prince Edward Island. Cajuns remained isolated in the swamps of southern Louisiana well into the 20th century. During the early part of the 20th century, attempts were made to suppress Cajun culture by measures such as forbidding the use of the Louisiana French language in schools.The Creole people of Louisiana are split into two racial divisions. Créole was the term first given to French settlers born in Louisiana when it was a colony of France. In Spanish, the term for natives was criollo. Given the immigration and settlement patterns, white Creoles are predominantly of French and Spanish ancestry. As the slave population grew in Louisiana, there were also enslaved blacks who could be called Creoles, in the sense of having been born in the colony.

The special meaning of Louisiana Creole, however, is associated with free people of color (gens de couleur libres), which was generally a third class of mixed-race people who were concentrated in southern Louisiana and New Orleans. This group was formed under French and Spanish rule, made up at first of descendants from relationships between colonial men and enslaved women, mostly African. As time went on, colonial men chose companions who were often women of color, or mixed-race. Often the men would free their companions and children if still enslaved. The arrangements were formalized in New Orleans as plaçage, often associated with property settlements for the young women and education for their children, or at least for sons. Creoles who were free people of color during French and Spanish rule formed a distinct class; many were educated and became wealthy property owners or artisans, and they were politically active. Often these mixed-race Creoles married only among themselves. They were a distinct group between French and Spanish descendants, and the mass of enslaved Africans.

After the Haitian Revolution, the class of free people of color in New Orleans and Louisiana was increased by French-speaking refugees and immigrants from Haiti. At the same time, French-speaking whites entered the city, some bringing slaves with them, who in Haiti were mostly African natives. In 1809, nearly 10,000 refugees from Saint-Domingue arrived from Cuba, where they had first fled, to settle en masse in New Orleans. They doubled that city’s population and helped preserve its French language and culture for several generations.

Creoles of color today are frequently racially mixed, being of African, French (and/or Spanish) and/or Native American heritage. Their families have historically adhered to the French or Creole-speaking environment and culture. The separate status of Creoles of color was diminished after the Louisiana Purchase, and even more so after the American Civil War. Those Creoles who had been free for generations before the American Civil War lost some of their legal and social standing.

Black and African Americans 

Louisiana's population had the second largest proportion of Black and African Americans in the United States in 2010, after Mississippi. The Black and African American population have been historically concentrated throughout much of the state, divided along cultural lines; the Black/African American communities upstate are predominantly Protestant affiliates with the National Baptist Convention (USA) and National Baptist Convention of America. The remainder of the communities in southern Louisiana often adhere to Catholicism, though Louisiana Voodoo and Haitian Vodou are also practiced by a minority. Among the Black and African American Catholic communities in southern Louisiana, cultural distinctives commonly kept are Gospel music and some Charismatic Christian traits.

Hispanic and Latino Americans 

Among Hispanic and Latino American Louisianans, some families can trace their heritage toward Spanish Louisiana. Canary Islanders settled in the area down river from New Orleans, now St. Bernard Parish, and in other parts of the southeast of the state during Spanish rule. These would form the basis of Louisiana's Isleño population. Settlement at the Los Adaes presidio and mission also resulted in a local Spanish-speaking population along the Sabine River. Louisiana has a growing Mexican and Central American population. The majority of Latinos in Louisiana are of Mexican origin.

Asian Americans 

Asian Indians were the largest group of Asian Americans in the state, followed by the Chinese. Filipinos were the third largest single Asian American ethnicity.

The first significant wave of Chinese migration took place during Reconstruction after the American Civil War. Local planters imported Cantonese contract workers from Cuba and California as a low-cost substitute for slave labor. By 1870, the Chinese had begun migrating from the plantations to the cities, especially New Orleans, forming a Chinatown that existed from the 1880s until its removal by WPA development in 1937. The Chinese dominated the city's laundry industry during this period, as they had in other American cities. But by the 1940s, the younger generation of American-born Chinese were already entering college and abandoning the laundry industry.

Subsequent waves of immigration have brought many Chinese from Taiwan, Hong Kong, Mainland China, as well as Indians, Middle Easterners, Koreans, Japanese, Southeast Asians, and other Asians, to New Orleans, Baton Rouge, and other cities in the state. The Vietnamese began migrating to the southern part of the state and the Gulf Coast region after the Fall of Saigon in 1975. Since then, the Vietnamese have become one of the largest Asian populations in the state. The Vietnamese have also come to dominate the fishing and shrimping industry in southeast Louisiana.

Filipinos had immigrated all the way to the Southern United States from the Philippines. Filipinos rebelled against slavery on ships and settled in Louisiana, near the similarly Spanish-colonized independent ethnic Isleño community. The oldest community of Asian Americans in the United States at Saint Malo, Louisiana was founded by Filipino exiles from the Manila Galleon trade between Mexico and the Philippines. The exact date of the establishment of Saint Malo is disputed. The settlement may have been formed as early as 1763 or 1765 by the Filipino deserters and escaped slaves of the Spanish Manila Galleon trade. The members of the community were commonly referred to as Manila men, or Manilamen, and later Tagalas. Filipino Americans residing in the region were recruited by local pirate Jean Lafitte to join his Baratarians, a group of privately recruited soldiers serving under the American forces under the command of Andrew Jackson, in the defense of New Orleans. They played a decisive role in securing the American victory, firing barrage after barrage of well-aimed artillery fire.

Several Asians have held high office in Louisiana. Harry Lee, a Chinese American, was a federal judge, candidate for governor, and sheriff of Jefferson Parish, an office he held for 27 years, from 1979 until his death in 2007. The first Vietnamese American to be elected to U.S. Congress was Joseph Cao of New Orleans, in 2008. In 2007, former congressman Bobby Jindal of Baton Rouge was elected governor of Louisiana, becoming the first Indian American to be elected governor of any state.

Native Americans 
Louisiana is home to four federally recognized Native American tribes, the Chitimacha Tribe, the Coushatta Tribe, the Jena Band of Choctaw Indians, and the Tunica-Biloxi Indian Tribe, as well as the Houma people.

Birth data
Note: Births in table don't add up, because Hispanics are counted both by their ethnicity and by their race, giving a higher overall number.

Since 2016, data for births of White Hispanic origin are not collected, but included in one Hispanic group; persons of Hispanic origin may be of any race.

Languages
Louisiana has a unique linguistic culture, owing to its French and Spanish heritage. According to the 2000 U.S. census, among persons five years old and older, 90.8% of Louisiana residents speak only English (99% total speak English) and 4.7% speak French at home (7% total speak French). Other minority languages were Spanish, which was spoken by 2.5% of the population; Vietnamese, by 1.2%; and German, by 0.2%. Although state law recognizes the usage of English and French in certain circumstances, the Louisiana state constitution does not declare any "de jure official language or languages". Currently the "de facto administrative languages" of the Louisiana state government are English and French.

There are several unique dialects of French, Spanish, and English spoken in Louisiana. There are two unique dialects of the French language: Cajun French (predominant after the Great Upheaval of Acadians from Canada) and Colonial French. There is also Louisiana Creole French, a French-based creole language. Two varieties of Spanish, Isleño and Sabine River Spanish are native to Louisiana and date back to the Spanish colonial period. There are also two unique dialects of the English language: Cajun English, a French-influenced variety of English, and what is informally known as Yat, which resembles the New York City dialect, particularly that of historical Brooklyn, as both accents were influenced by large communities of immigrant Irish and Italian, but the Yat dialect was also influenced by French and Spanish.

Colonial French was the predominant language of Louisiana during the French colonial period and was spoken primarily by the white/white creole settlers; the black/black creole population spoke mostly creole. Cajun French was only introduced in Louisiana after the Great Upheaval of Acadians from Canada during 1710-1763. The Cajun people and culture (hence the Cajun language as well) did not appear immediately but was rather a slow evolution from the original Acadian culture with influences from local cultures. English and its associated dialects became predominant only after the Louisiana Purchase and even then it still retained some French influences as seen with Cajun English. Cajun French and Colonial French have somewhat merged since English took over.

Religion
As an ethnically and culturally diverse state, pre-colonial, colonial and present-day Louisianians have adhered to a variety of religions and spiritual traditions; pre-colonial and colonial Louisianian peoples practiced various Native American religions alongside Christianity through the establishment of Spanish and French missions; and other faiths including Haitian Vodou and Louisiana Voodoo were introduced to the state and are practiced to the present day. In the colonial and present-day U.S. state of Louisiana, Christianity grew to become its most predominant religion, representing 84% of the adult population in 2014 and 76.5% in 2020, during two separate studies by the Pew Research Center and Public Religion Research Institute.

Among its Christian population—and in common with other southern U.S. states—the majority, particularly in the north of the state, belong to various Protestant denominations; Protestantism was introduced to the state in the 1800s, with Baptists establishing two churches in 1812, followed by Methodists; Episcopalians first entered the state by 1805. Protestant Christians made up 57% of the state's adult population at the 2014 Pew Research Center study, and 53% at the 2020 Public Religion Research Institute's study. Protestants are concentrated in North Louisiana, Central Louisiana, and the northern tier of the Florida Parishes. According to the 2014 study, Louisiana's largest Protestant Christian denominations were the Southern Baptist Convention, National Baptist Convention USA, National Baptist Convention of America, Progressive National Baptist Convention, American Baptist Churches USA, non/interdenominational Evangelicals and mainline Protestants, the Assemblies of God USA, Church of God in Christ, African Methodist Episcopal and Christian Methodist Episcopal churches, and the United Methodist Church.

According to a prior study by Association of Religion Data Archives in 2010, the Southern Baptist Convention had 709,650 members, and the United Methodist Church had 146,848; non-denominational Protestant churches had 195,903 members. In another study by the Association of Religion Data Archives in 2020, the Southern Baptists remained the state's largest Protestant denomination (648,734), followed by the United Methodists (128,108); non-denominational Protestants—whether independent congregationalist, United and Uniting, or Bible churches—increased to 357,465. National Missionary Baptists reported 67,518 members, and the National Baptist Convention USA had a statewide membership of 61,997, making them the largest historically and predominantly African American church bodies in the state. In this study, Pentecostals were the largest Protestant traditions outside of the Baptists and Methodists; the Assemblies of God USA (45,773) was the state's largest Pentecostal body followed by the Church of God in Christ (32,116). The Protestant Episcopal Church in the United States of America had 23,922 members, and the remaining largest Protestant denominations were the Churches of Christ (22,833), Progressive National Baptists (22,756), National Baptists of America (22,034), and Full Gospel Baptists (9,772).

Because of French and Spanish heritage, and their descendants the Creoles, and later Irish, Italian, Portuguese and German immigrants, southern Louisiana and Greater New Orleans are predominantly Catholic in contrast; according to the 2020 Public Religion Research Institute study, 22% of the adult population were Catholic. Since Creoles were the first settlers, planters and leaders of the territory, they have traditionally been well represented in politics; for instance, most of the early governors were Creole Catholics, instead of Protestants. As Catholics continue to constitute a significant fraction of Louisiana's population, they have continued to be influential in state politics. The high proportion and influence of the Catholic population makes Louisiana distinct among southern states. The Roman Catholic Archdiocese of New Orleans, Diocese of Baton Rouge, and Diocese of Lafayette in Louisiana are the largest Catholic jurisdictions in the state, located within the Greater New Orleans, Greater Baton Rouge, and Lafayette metropolitan statistical areas.

Outside of Christendom, Louisiana was among the southern states with a significant Jewish population before the 20th century; Virginia, South Carolina, and Georgia also had influential Jewish populations in some of their major cities from the 18th and 19th centuries. The earliest Jewish colonists were Sephardic Jews who immigrated to the Thirteen Colonies. Later in the 19th century, German Jews began to immigrate, followed by those from eastern Europe and the Russian Empire in the late 19th and early 20th centuries. Jewish communities have been established in the state's larger cities, notably New Orleans and Baton Rouge. The most significant of these is the Jewish community of the New Orleans area. In 2000, before the 2005 Hurricane Katrina, its population was about 12,000. Dominant Jewish movements in the state include Orthodox and Reform Judaism; Reform Judaism was the largest Jewish tradition in the state according to the Association of Religion Data Archives in 2020, representing some 5,891 Jews.

Prominent Jews in Louisiana's political leadership have included Whig (later Democrat) Judah P. Benjamin (1811–1884), who represented Louisiana in the U.S. Senate before the American Civil War and then became the Confederate secretary of state; Democrat-turned-Republican Michael Hahn who was elected as governor, serving 1864–1865 when Louisiana was occupied by the Union Army, and later elected in 1884 as a U.S. congressman; Democrat Adolph Meyer (1842–1908), Confederate Army officer who represented the state in the U.S. House of Representatives from 1891 until his death in 1908; Republican secretary of state Jay Dardenne (1954–), and Republican (Democrat before 2011) attorney general Buddy Caldwell (1946–).

Other non-Christian and non-Jewish religions with a continuous, historical presence in the state have been Islam, Buddhism and Hinduism. In the Shreveport–Bossier City metropolitan area, Muslims made up an estimated 14% of Louisiana's total Muslim population as of 2014. In 2020, the Association of Religion Data Archives estimated there were 24,732 Muslims living in the state. The largest Islamic denominations in the major metropolises of Louisiana were Sunni Islam, non-denominational Islam and Quranism, Shia Islam, and the Nation of Islam.

Among Louisiana's irreligious community, 2% affiliated with Atheism and 13% claimed no religion as of 2014; an estimated 10% of the state's population practiced nothing in particular at the 2014 study. According to the Public Religion Research Institute in 2020, 19% were religiously unaffiliated.

References

 
Louisiana